Filippo Barbieri or Philippus de Barberiis (1426–87) was a Dominican inquisitor and historian from Syracuse. He composed two, or possibly three chronicles in Latin prose.

References

1426 births
1487 deaths
Italian Dominicans
People from Syracuse, Sicily
Italian chroniclers